The 2008 Meineke Car Care Bowl was the seventh edition of the college football bowl game, and was played at Bank of America Stadium in Charlotte, North Carolina.  The game started at 1:00 PM US EST on Saturday, December 27, 2008. The game, telecast on ESPN, pitted the North Carolina Tar Heels against the West Virginia Mountaineers, with the Mountaineers winning over the Heels 31–30. The crowd of 73,712 was the largest in the bowl's seven-year history and the largest ever to see a college football game in the state of North Carolina.  It was also the fourth-largest crowd of the 2008 bowl season, and the second-largest for a non-BCS bowl.

Scoring summary

References

Meineke Car Care Bowl
Duke's Mayo Bowl
North Carolina Tar Heels football bowl games
West Virginia Mountaineers football bowl games
Meineke Car Care Bowl
December 2008 sports events in the United States